National Highway 228 was a hypothetical highway encircling the island of Taiwan as part of the National Highway System of the People's Republic of China. It never came into existence due to the political status of Taiwan. The People's Republic of China claims control over Taiwan while it is currently administered and controlled by the Republic of China. Taiwan has its own highway system and does not recognize the designation by the People's Republic of China.

This observation was eventually dropped in new National Highway plans, replaced by the Dandong-Dongxing Highway in 2013.

References

See also

Taiwan Province, People's Republic of China
G99 Taiwan Ring Expressway
Highway system in Taiwan

Cancelled highway projects
Cross-Strait relations
National Highways in China